Messiah is an action-adventure video game developed by Shiny Entertainment and published by Interplay. The game was promoted for its tessellation technology, which was claimed to drastically increase or reduce the number of polygons based on the speed of the system running the game. Messiah received a mixed response from reviewers.

Plot
The player controls Bob, a putto sent by God to remove the corruption and sin on Earth. The dictator of Earth, Father Prime, is conducting experiments into other dimensions on the dark side of the Moon. Soon after landing on Earth, Bob's existence is deemed illegal and he finds himself hunted by police, along with the military. Meanwhile, Father Prime's experiments succeed in bringing Satan into the mortal plane. After making his way through the cyberpunk city of Faktur, Bob confronts and defeats Father Prime. Bob is then asked to return by God, telling him that if humans are prepared to tamper with His creations, there is no place for Him on Earth and leave them to their own devices. Bob refuses, and this turns out to be a ruse by Satan to lead the cherub astray.

After making his way through the industrial parts of the city, Bob infiltrates a nuclear power station and transports himself to the facility on the dark side of the Moon, ultimately confronting and banishing Satan, which destroys the facility. Bob is then thrown onto a barren part of the Moon. Bob repeatedly requests God to take him home but is met with silence.

Gameplay

The game is set sometime in the distant future. The environment is a comedic take on a cyberpunk city. The levels are large and relatively open in both the horizontal and vertical dimensions. The player, as Bob, is able to fly around at great heights, although his small wings can only carry him a limited distance from the ground, necessitating a combination of climbing and flying, and so the gameplay environment features a great deal of vertical movement and exploration.

While in his cherub form, Bob is defenseless and can very easily be killed; however, he may possess any biological lifeform by jumping into their body. The most common type of lifeform is human, and Bob will spend much of his time jumping from one to another. Other examples include rats, cyborgs and aliens. In more difficult levels, Bob can only possess another body when the target is oblivious to his presence, thus adding a stealth element to the game.

Once in control of a host, he can interact with the environment and non-player characters (NPCs) by using switches or weapons and fighting in unarmed combat. Some switches require a specific human host to activate (e.g. a scientist is required to access a secure laboratory area, or a radiation worker to handle live nuclear material); these form the basis for the game's puzzles. Other puzzles include using Bob's wings to access somewhere out of reach or too small for a host body to enter.

Most humans will ignore Bob, or be intrigued by him. The police and security force, however, will shoot on sight, as will the Chots - a separatist, cannibalistic humanoid race who regularly appear in street battles with the police in hopes of driving the Fathers out of power. As Bob progresses through the game, his reputation precedes him, and he is actively sought after by the police.

Development
Lead designer David Perry intended Messiah to be targeted towards adults, in contrast to Shiny's previous games such as Earthworm Jim, and predominantly towards males.

The development team heavily touted the game's tessellation technology, which they said could reduce or increase the number of polygons displayed in real time based on the hardware running the game, thereby maximizing the level of detail possible on any given hardware setup, stabilizing the frame rate, and enabling real-time interpolation and volumetric lighting. In a 1997 interview Perry said Shiny had filed for a patent on the technology.

The character models were built in 3D Studio. The game's characters were all animated using motion capture, with a person with dwarfism serving as the motion capture actor for Bob.

It was announced that Messiah would be released simultaneously for the PC and PlayStation in the second quarter of 1998, with another console port following as a launch title for the Dreamcast. However, the game would be delayed nearly two years, and neither a PlayStation version nor a Dreamcast version was ever released.

In February 1998, a couple years before Messiah was released, the Los Angeles Times reported a public outcry over the title. Perry explained, "It's crazy that all these people are already upset and they haven't even seen the game." Jeff Green of Computer Gaming World stated, "You can't use the word 'messiah' and not know you're going to tweak the sensibilities of the religious community." The developers received upset responses from many Christian organizations as well as consumers, including one that commented, "The word ‘messiah’ is such a powerful word, I just can’t ignore it or its connotations. I know there are a lot of things out there that already tarnish religious imagery. But I just can’t support a company that would throw around that word so lightly."

In August 1999, Interplay recorded several promotional commercials with Hank the Angry Drunken Dwarf from The Howard Stern Radio Show. Hank would don an angel costume and wandered the streets of various cities with a sign to publicly promote the game.

Part of the game's soundtrack was contributed by industrial metal band Fear Factory, and was later released as Messiah.

Reception

The game received "average" reviews according to the review aggregation website GameRankings. The earliest review came from Edge, which gave it a score of seven out of ten, nearly two months before the game itself was released in North America, and over two months before its European release date. Computer Gaming World declared the title "truly repellent - I don't even like to think of the sort of sadist who would enjoy it." The review detailed that beside "a level of sexism that goes beyond the usual demeaning stereotypes" and "adolescent edginess" that "there's a general atmosphere of cruelty, of enjoying violence not for the adrenaline rush of the action or even for the fun of cartoonish bloodshed - but for the realistic pain it causes." Jim Preston of NextGen said, "If you can get past some technical glitches, awkward controls, and routine gameplay, Messiah will deliver – for a little while."

According to author Erik Bethke, Messiah was a commercial flop, with "fewer than 10,000 units sold in its first three months".

The game was nominated for GameSpots 2000 "Most Disappointing Game" award, which went to Star Wars: Force Commander.

Legacy
Throughout the game, the main character makes a sound (referred to as "oof"), which has been taken by the popular game Roblox as a sound effect for when a character dies. There was a subsequent legal dispute over the use of the "oof" sound, which led to a compensation agreement. On July 26, 2022, the sound was removed from Roblox and replaced with another.

References

External links
 
 

2000 video games
Action-adventure games
Cancelled Dreamcast games
Cancelled PlayStation (console) games
Cyberpunk video games
Dystopian video games
Shiny Entertainment games
Stealth video games
Video games about angels
Video games about children
Video games about spirit possession
Video games designed by David Perry
Video games developed in the United States
Video games scored by Jesper Kyd
Windows games
Windows-only games
Roblox